Alexander Nikolayevich Scriabin was a Russian composer and virtuoso pianist. Before 1903, Scriabin was greatly influenced by the music of Frédéric Chopin and composed in a relatively tonal, late Romantic idiom. Later, and independently of his influential contemporary, Arnold Schoenberg, Scriabin developed a much more dissonant musical language that had transcended usual tonality but was not atonal, which accorded with his personal brand of metaphysics. Scriabin found significant appeal in the concept of Gesamtkunstwerk as well as synesthesia, and associated colours with the various harmonic tones of his scale, while his colour-coded circle of fifths was also inspired by theosophy. He is often considered the main Russian Symbolist composer and a major representative of the Russian Silver Age.

Scriabin was an innovator as well as one of the most controversial composer-pianists of the early 20th century. The Great Soviet Encyclopedia said of him, "no composer has had more scorn heaped on him or greater love bestowed." Leo Tolstoy described Scriabin's music as "a sincere expression of genius." Scriabin's oeuvre exerted a salient influence on the music world over time, and inspired composers such as Igor Stravinsky, Sergei Prokofiev, and Karol Szymanowski. But Scriabin's importance in the Russian and then Soviet musical scene, and internationally, drastically declined after his death. According to his biographer Faubion Bowers, "No one was more famous during their lifetime, and few were more quickly ignored after death." Nevertheless, his musical aesthetics have been reevaluated since the 1970s, and his ten published sonatas for piano and other works have been increasingly championed, garnering significant acclaim in recent years.

Biography

Childhood and education (1872–1893)

Scriabin was born in Moscow into a Russian noble family on Christmas Day, 1871, according to the Julian Calendar. His father, Nikolai Aleksandrovich Scriabin, then a student at the Moscow State University, belonged to a modest noble family founded by Scriabin's great-grandfather Ivan Alekseevich Scriabin, a soldier from Tula who had a brilliant military career and was granted hereditary nobility in 1819. Alexander's paternal grandmother, Elizaveta Ivanovna Podchertkova, daughter of a captain lieutenant, came from a wealthy noble house of the Novgorod Governorate. His mother, Lyubov Petrovna Scriabina (née Schetinina), was a concert pianist and a former student of Theodor Leschetizky. She belonged to an ancient dynasty that traced its history back to Rurik; its founder, Semyon Feodorovich Yaroslavskiy, nicknamed Schetina (from the Russian schetina meaning stubble), was the great-grandson of Vasili, Prince of Yaroslavl. She died of tuberculosis when Alexander was only a year old.

After her death, Nikolai Scriabin completed tuition in the Turkish language in St. Petersburg's Institute of Oriental Languages and left for Turkey. Like all his relatives, he followed a military path and served as a military attaché in the status of Active State Councillor; he was appointed an honorary consul in Lausanne during his later years. Alexander's father left the infant Sasha (as he was known) with his grandmother, great-aunt, and aunt. Scriabin's father later remarried, giving Scriabin a number of half-brothers and sisters. His aunt Lyubov (his father's unmarried sister) was an amateur pianist who documented Sasha's early life until he met his first wife. As a child, Scriabin was frequently exposed to piano playing; anecdotal references describe him demanding that his aunt play for him.

Apparently precocious, Scriabin began building pianos after becoming fascinated with piano mechanisms. He sometimes gave houseguests pianos he had built. Lyubov portrays Scriabin as very shy and unsociable with his peers, but appreciative of adult attention. According to one anecdote, Scriabin tried to conduct an orchestra composed of local children, an attempt that ended in frustration and tears. He performed his own plays and operas with puppets to willing audiences. He studied the piano from an early age, taking lessons with Nikolai Zverev, a strict disciplinarian, who was also the teacher of Sergei Rachmaninoff and other piano prodigies, though Scriabin was not a pensioner like Rachmaninoff.

In 1882, Scriabin enlisted in the Second Moscow Cadet Corps. As a student, he became friends with the actor Leonid Limontov, who in his memoirs recalls his reluctance to become friends with Scriabin, who was the smallest and weakest among all the boys and sometimes teased due to his stature. But Scriabin won his peers' approval at a concert where he performed on the piano. He ranked generally first in his class academically, but was exempt from drilling due to his physique and given time each day to practice piano.

Scriabin later studied at the Moscow Conservatory with Anton Arensky, Sergei Taneyev, and Vasily Safonov. He became a noted pianist despite his small hands, which could barely stretch to a ninth. Feeling challenged by Josef Lhévinne, he damaged his right hand while practicing Franz Liszt's Réminiscences de Don Juan and Mily Balakirev's Islamey. His doctor said he would never recover, and he wrote his first large-scale masterpiece, his Piano Sonata No. 1 in F minor, as a "cry against God, against fate." It was the third sonata he wrote, but the first to which he gave an opus number (his second was condensed and released as the Allegro Appassionato, Op. 4). He eventually regained the use of his hand.

In 1892 he graduated with the Little Gold Medal in piano performance, but did not complete a composition degree because of strong personality and musical differences with Arensky (whose faculty signature is the only one absent from Scriabin's graduation certificate) and an unwillingness to compose pieces in forms that did not interest him.

Early career (1894–1903)
In 1894, Scriabin made his debut as a pianist in St. Petersburg, performing his own works to positive reviews. The same year, Mitrofan Belyayev agreed to pay Scriabin to compose for his publishing company (he published works by notable composers such as Nikolai Rimsky-Korsakov and Alexander Glazunov). In August 1897, Scriabin married the pianist Vera Ivanovna Isakovich, and then toured in Russia and abroad, culminating in a successful 1898 concert in Paris. That year he became a teacher at the Moscow Conservatory and began to establish his reputation as a composer. During this period he composed his cycle of études, Op. 8, several sets of preludes, his first three piano sonatas, and his only piano concerto, among other works, mostly for piano.

For five years, Scriabin was based in Moscow, during which time his old teacher Safonov conducted the first two of Scriabin's symphonies.

According to later reports, between 1901 and 1903 Scriabin envisioned writing an opera. He expounded its ideas in the course of normal conversation. The work would center around a nameless hero, a philosopher-musician-poet. Among other things, he would declare: I am the apotheosis of world creation. I am the aim of aims, the end of ends. The Poem Op. 32 No. 2 and the Poème tragique Op. 34 were originally conceived as arias in the opera.

Leaving Russia (1903–09)
By the winter of 1904, Scriabin and his wife had relocated to Switzerland, where he began work on his Symphony No. 3. While living in Switzerland, Scriabin was separated legally from his wife, with whom he had had four children. The work was performed in Paris during 1905, where Scriabin was accompanied by Tatiana Fyodorovna Schloezer—a former pupil and the niece of Paul de Schlözer. With Schloezer, he had other children, including a son, Julian Scriabin, a precocious composer of several piano works who drowned in the Dnieper River at Kiev in 1919 at the age of 11.

With a wealthy sponsor's financial assistance, Scriabin spent several years travelling in Switzerland, Italy, France, Belgium and the United States, working on more orchestral pieces, including several symphonies. He also began to compose "poems" for the piano, a form with which he is particularly associated. While in New York City, in 1907, he became acquainted with the Canadian composer Alfred La Liberté, who became a personal friend and disciple.

In 1907, Scriabin settled in Paris with his family and was involved with a series of concerts organized by the impresario Sergei Diaghilev, who was actively promoting Russian music in the West at the time. He subsequently relocated to Brussels (rue de la Réforme 45) with his family.

Return to Russia (1909–15)
In 1909, Scriabin permanently returned to Russia, where he continued to compose, working on increasingly grandiose projects. For some time before his death he had planned a multimedia work, to be performed in the Himalaya Mountains, that would cause a so-called "armageddon", "a grandiose religious synthesis of all arts which would herald the birth of a new world." Scriabin left only sketches for this piece, Mysterium, although a preliminary part, L'acte préalable ("Prefatory Action"), was eventually made into a performable version by Alexander Nemtin. Part of that unfinished piece was performed with the title Prefatory Action by Vladimir Ashkenazy in Berlin with Aleksei Lyubimov at the piano. Nemtin eventually completed a second portion ("Mankind") and a third ("Transfiguration"), and Ashkenazy recorded his entire two-and-a-half-hour completion with the Deutsches Symphonie-Orchester Berlin for Decca. Several late pieces published during Scriabin's lifetime are believed to have been intended for Mysterium, such as the Two Dances Op. 73.

Death
Scriabin gave his last concert on 2 April 1915 in St. Petersburg, performing a large programme of his own works. He received rave reviews from music critics, who called his playing "most inspiring and affecting", and wrote, "his eyes flashed fire and his face radiated happiness". Scriabin himself wrote that during his performance of his Third Sonata, "I completely forgot I was playing in a hall with people around me. This happens very rarely to me on the platform."

Scriabin returned triumphantly to his Moscow apartment on 4 April. He noticed a resurgence of a little pimple on his right upper lip. He had mentioned the pimple as early as 1914 while in London. His temperature rose, and he took to bed and cancelled his Moscow concert for 11 April. The pimple became a pustule, then a carbuncle and a furuncle. Scriabin's doctor remarked that the sore looked "like purple fire". Incisions were made on 12 April, but the sore had already begun to poison his blood, and he became delirious. Bowers writes: "intractably and inexplicably, a simple spot had grown into a terminal ailment." On 14 April 1915, at age 43 and at the height of his career, Scriabin died in his Moscow apartment.

Music

Rather than seeking musical versatility, Scriabin was happy to write almost exclusively for solo piano and for orchestra. His earliest piano pieces resemble Frédéric Chopin's and include music in many genres that Chopin employed, such as the étude, the prelude, the nocturne, and the mazurka. Scriabin's music rapidly evolved over the course of his life. The mid- and late-period pieces use very unusual harmonies and textures.

The development of Scriabin's style can be traced in his ten piano sonatas: the earliest are composed in a fairly conventional late-Romantic manner and reveal the influence of Chopin and sometimes Franz Liszt, but the later ones are very different, the last five lacking a key signature. Many passages in them can be said to be tonally vague, though from 1903 through 1908, "tonal unity was almost imperceptibly replaced by harmonic unity."

First period (1880s–1903)
Scriabin's first period is usually considered to last from his earliest pieces to his Second Symphony Op. 29. The works from this period adhere to the romantic tradition, employing common-practice harmonic language. But Scriabin's voice is present from the very beginning, in this case by his fondness for the dominant function and added tone chords.

Scriabin's early harmonic language was especially fond of the 13th dominant chord, usually with the 7th, 3rd, and 13th spelled in fourths. This voicing can also be seen in several of Chopin's works. According to Peter Sabbagh, this voicing was the main generating source of the later Mystic chord. More importantly, Scriabin was fond of simultaneously combining two or more different dominant-seventh enhancements, such as 9ths, altered 5ths, and raised 11ths. But despite these tendencies, slightly more dissonant than usual for the time, all these dominant chords were treated according to the traditional rules: the added tones resolved to the corresponding adjacent notes, and the whole chord was treated as a dominant, fitting inside tonality and diatonic, functional harmony.

Second period (1903–07)
This period begins with Scriabin's Fourth Piano Sonata Op. 30, and ends around his Fifth Sonata Op. 53 and the Poem of Ecstasy Op. 54. During this period, Scriabin's music becomes more chromatic and dissonant, yet still mostly adheres to functional tonality. As dominant chords are more and more extended, they gradually lose their tensive function. Scriabin wanted his music to have a radiant, shining feeling, and attempted this by raising the number of chord tones. During this time, complex forms like the mystic chord are hinted at, but still show their roots in Chopinesque harmony.

At first, the added dissonances resolve conventionally according to voice leading, but the focus slowly shifts to a system in which chord coloring is most important. Later on, fewer dissonances in the dominant chords are resolved. According to Sabbanagh, "the dissonances are frozen, solidified in a color-like effect in the chord"; the added notes become part of it.

Third period (1907–15)

According to Samson, while the sonata form of Scriabin's Sonata No. 5 has some meaning to the work's tonal structure, in his Sonata No. 6 and Sonata No. 7 formal tensions are created by the absence of harmonic contrast and "between the cumulative momentum of the music, usually achieved by textural rather than harmonic means, and the formal constraints of the tripartite mould". He also argues that the Poem of Ecstasy and Vers la flamme "find a much happier co-operation of 'form' and 'content and that later sonatas, such as No. 9, employ a more flexible sonata form.

According to Claude Herdon, in Scriabin's late music "tonality has been attenuated to the point of virtual extinction, although dominant sevenths, which are among the strongest indicators of tonality, preponderate. The progression of their roots in minor thirds or diminished fifths [...] dissipate the suggested tonality."

Varvara Dernova writes, "The tonic continued to exist, and, if necessary, the composer could employ it [...] but in the great majority of cases, he preferred the concept of a tonic in distant perspective, so to speak, rather than the actually sounding tonic [...] The relationship of the tonic and dominant functions in Scriabin's work is changed radically; for the dominant actually appears and has a varied structure, while the tonic exists only as if in the imagination of the composer, the performer, and the listener."

Most of the music of this period is built on the acoustic and octatonic scales, as well as the nine-note scale resulting from their combination.

Philosophical influences and influence of colour
Scriabin was interested in Friedrich Nietzsche's Übermensch theory, and later became interested in theosophy. Both influenced his music and musical thought. During 1909–10 he lived in Brussels, becoming interested in Jean Delville's Theosophist philosophy and continuing his reading of Helena Blavatsky.

Theosophist and composer Dane Rudhyar wrote that Scriabin was "the one great pioneer of the new music of a reborn Western civilization, the father of the future musician", and an antidote to "the Latin reactionaries and their apostle, Stravinsky" and the "rule-ordained" music of "Schoenberg's group." Scriabin developed his own very personal and abstract mysticism based on the role of the artist in relation to perception and life affirmation. His ideas on reality seem similar to Platonic and Aristotelian theory, though much less coherent. The main sources of his philosophy can be found in his numerous unpublished notebooks, in one of which he wrote "I am God". The notebooks contain complex and technical diagrams explaining his metaphysics. Scriabin also used poetry to express his philosophical notions, though arguably much of his philosophical thought was translated into music, the most recognizable example being the Ninth Sonata ("the Black Mass").

Though Scriabin's late works are often considered to be influenced by synesthesia, an involuntary condition wherein one experiences sensation in one sense in response to stimulus in another, it is doubted that Scriabin actually experienced this. His colour system, unlike most synesthetic experience, accords with the circle of fifths, which tends to prove it was mostly a conceptual system based on Sir Isaac Newton's Opticks.

Scriabin did not, for his theory, recognize a difference between major and a minor tonality with the same tonic, such as C minor and C major. Indeed, influenced by theosophy, he developed his system of synesthesia toward what would have been a pioneering multimedia performance: his unrealized magnum opus Mysterium was to have been a weeklong performance including music, scent, dance, and light in the foothills of the Himalayas that was somehow to bring about the world's dissolution in bliss.

In his autobiographical Recollections, Sergei Rachmaninoff recorded a conversation he had had with Scriabin and Nikolai Rimsky-Korsakov about Scriabin's association of colour and music. Rachmaninoff was surprised to find that Rimsky-Korsakov agreed with Scriabin about associations of musical keys with colors; himself skeptical, Rachmaninoff made the obvious objection that the two composers did not always agree on the colours involved. Both maintained that D major is golden-brown, but Scriabin linked E-flat major with red-purple, while Rimsky-Korsakov favored blue. Rimsky-Korsakov protested that a passage in Rachmaninoff's opera The Miserly Knight accorded with their claim: the scene in which the Old Baron opens treasure chests to reveal gold and jewels glittering in torchlight is in D major. Scriabin told Rachmaninoff, "your intuition has unconsciously followed the laws whose very existence you have tried to deny."

Scriabin wrote only a small number of orchestral works, but they are among his most famous, and some are performed frequently. They include a piano concerto (1896), and five symphonic works: three numbered symphonies, The Poem of Ecstasy (1908), and Prometheus: The Poem of Fire (1910), which includes a part for a machine known as a "clavier à lumières", also known as a Luce (Italian for "light"), a colour organ designed specifically for the performance of Scriabin's tone poem. It was played like a piano, but projected coloured light on a screen in the concert hall rather than sound. Most performances of the piece (including the premiere) have omitted this light element, although a performance in New York City in 1915 projected colours onto a screen. It has been erroneously claimed that this performance used the colour-organ invented by English painter A. Wallace Rimington; in fact, it was a novel construction supervised personally and built in New York specifically for the performance by Preston S. Miller, the president of the Illuminating Engineering Society.

On 22 November 1969, the work was fully realized, making use of the composer's color score as well as newly developed laser technology on loan from Yale's Physics Department, by John Mauceri and the Yale Symphony Orchestra and designed by Richard N. Gould, who projected the colors into the auditorium reflected by Mylar vests worn by the audience. The Yale Symphony repeated the presentation in 1971 and brought the work to Paris that year for what was perhaps its Paris premiere at the Théâtre des Champs Élysées. The piece was reprised at Yale again in 2010 (who, with Justin Townsend, wrote Scriabin and the Possible).

Scriabin's original colour keyboard, with its associated turntable of coloured lamps, is preserved in his apartment near the Arbat in Moscow, which is now a museum dedicated to his life and works.

Recordings and performers
Scriabin himself made recordings of 19 of his own works, using 20 piano rolls, six for the Welte-Mignon, and 14 for Ludwig Hupfeld of Leipzig. The Welte rolls were recorded in February 1910 in Moscow, and have been replayed and published on CD. Those recorded for Hupfeld include the piano sonatas Op. 19 and 23. While this indirect evidence of Scriabin's pianism prompted a mixed critical reception, close analysis of the recordings within the context of the limitations of the particular piano roll technology can shed light on the free style he favoured for his own works, characterized by extemporary variations in tempo, rhythm, articulation, dynamics, and sometimes even the notes.

Pianists who have performed Scriabin to particular critical acclaim include Vladimir Sofronitsky, Vladimir Horowitz and Sviatoslav Richter. Sofronitsky never met Scriabin, as his parents forbade him to attend a concert due to illness. Sofronitsky said he never forgave them, but he married Scriabin's daughter Elena. According to Horowitz, when he played for Scriabin as an 11-year-old, Scriabin responded enthusiastically and encouraged him to pursue a full musical and artistic education. When Rachmaninoff performed Scriabin's music, Scriabin criticized his pianism and his admirers as earthbound.

Surveys of the solo piano works have been recorded by Gordon Fergus-Thompson, Pervez Mody, Maria Lettberg, Joseph Villa, Michael Ponti, and Elina Akselrud. The complete published sonatas have also been recorded by Dmitri Alexeev, Vladimir Ashkenazy, Robert Taub, Håkon Austbø, Boris Berman, Bernd Glemser, Marc-André Hamelin, Yakov Kasman, Ruth Laredo, John Ogdon, Garrick Ohlsson, Roberto Szidon, Anatol Ugorski, Anna Malikova, Mikhail Voskresensky, and Igor Zhukov, among others.

Other prominent performers of Scriabin's piano music include Samuil Feinberg, Elena Bekman-Shcherbina, Nikolai Demidenko, Marta Deyanova, Sergio Fiorentino, Andrei Gavrilov, Emil Gilels, Glenn Gould, Andrej Hoteev, Evgeny Kissin, Anton Kuerti, Elena Kuschnerova, Piers Lane, Eric Le Van, Alexander Melnikov, Stanislav Neuhaus, Artur Pizarro, Mikhail Pletnev, Jonathan Powell, Burkard Schliessmann, Grigory Sokolov, Alexander Satz, Yevgeny Sudbin, Matthijs Verschoor, Arcadi Volodos, Roger Woodward, Evgeny Zarafiants, Alexey Chernov, and Margarita Shevchenko.

In 2015, German-Australian pianist Stefan Ammer, as a part of The Scriabin Project Concert Series, joined his pupils Mekhla Kumar, Konstantin Shamray and Ashley Hribar to honour Scriabin at various venues in Australia.

Reception and influence

Scriabin's funeral, on 16 April 1915, was attended by so many people that tickets had to be issued. Rachmaninoff, a pallbearer, subsequently embarked on a grand tour of Russia, performing only Scriabin's music for the family's benefit. It was the first time Rachmaninoff had publicly performed piano music other than his own. Sergei Prokofiev admired Scriabin, and his Visions fugitives bears great likeness to Scriabin's tone and style. Another admirer was the English composer Kaikhosru Sorabji, who promoted Scriabin even during the years when his popularity had decreased greatly. Aaron Copland praised Scriabin's thematic material as "truly individual, truly inspired", but criticized Scriabin for putting "this really new body of feeling into the strait-jacket of the old classical sonata-form, recapitulation and all", calling this "one of the most extraordinary mistakes in all music."

The work of Nikolai Roslavets, unlike Prokofiev's and Stravinsky's, is often seen as a direct extension of Scriabin's. But unlike Scriabin's, Roslavets's music was not explained with mysticism and eventually was given theoretical explication by the composer. Roslavets was not alone in his innovative extension of Scriabin's musical language, as quite a few Soviet composers and pianists, such as Samuil Feinberg, Sergei Protopopov, Nikolai Myaskovsky, and Alexander Mosolov followed this legacy until Stalinist politics quelled it in favor of Socialist Realism.

Scriabin's music was greatly disparaged in the West during the 1930s.  In the UK Sir Adrian Boult refused to play the Scriabin selections chosen by the BBC programmer Edward Clark, calling it "evil music", and even banned Scriabin's music from broadcasts in the 1930s. In 1935, Gerald Abraham called Scriabin a "sad pathological case, erotic and egotistic to the point of mania". At the same time, the pianist Edward Mitchell, who compiled a catalogue of Scriabin's piano music in 1927,  was championing his music in recitals and regarded him as "the greatest composer since Beethoven".

Scriabin's music has since undergone a total rehabilitation and can be heard in major concert halls worldwide. In 2009, Roger Scruton called Scriabin "one of the greatest of modern composers".

In 2020, a bust of Scriabin was placed in the Small Hall of the Moscow Conservatory.

Relatives and descendants

Scriabin was the uncle of Metropolitan Anthony Bloom of Sourozh, a renowned bishop in the Russian Orthodox Church who directed the Russian Orthodox diocese in Great Britain between 1957 and 2003. Scriabin was not a relative of Soviet Minister of Foreign Affairs Vyacheslav Molotov, whose birth name was Vyacheslav Skryabin. In his memoirs published by Felix Chuyev under the Russian title "Молотов, Полудержавный властелин", Molotov explains that his brother Nikolay Skryabin, who was also a composer, had adopted the name Nikolay Nolinsky in order not to be confused with Alexander Scriabin.

Scriabin's second wife, Tatiana Fyodorovna Schlözer, was the niece of the pianist and composer Paul de Schlözer. Her brother was the music critic Boris de Schlözer. Scriabin had seven children in total: from his first marriage Rimma (Rima), Elena, Maria and Lev, and from his second Ariadna, Julian and Marina. Rimma died of intestinal issues in 1905 at age seven. Elena Scriabina became the first wife of the pianist Vladimir Sofronitsky after her father's death; Sofronitsky never met the composer. Maria Skryabina (1901–1989) became an actress at the Second Moscow Art Theatre and the wife of director Vladimir Tatarinov. Lev also died at age seven, in 1910. At this point, relations with Scriabin's first wife had significantly deteriorated, and Scriabin did not meet her at the funeral.

Scriabin's daughter Ariadna Scriabina (1906–1944) became a hero of the French Resistance, and was posthumously awarded the Croix de Guerre and the Médaille de la Résistance. Her third marriage was to the poet and WWII Resistance fighter David Knut, after which she converted to Judaism and took the name Sarah. She co-founded the Zionist resistance movement Armée Juive and was responsible for communications between the command in Toulouse and the partisan forces in the Tarn district and for taking weapons to the partisans, which resulted in her death when she was ambushed by the French Militia.

Ariadna Scriabina's daughter (by her first marriage to French composer David Lazarus), Betty Knut-Lazarus, became a famous teenage heroine of the French Resistance, personally winning the Silver Star from George S. Patton, as well as the French Croix de Guerre. After the war she became an active member of the Zionist Lehi (Stern Gang), undertaking special operations for the militant group, and she was imprisoned in 1947 for launching a terrorist letter bomb campaign against British targets and planting explosives on British ships that had been trying to prevent Jewish immigrants from travelling to Mandatory Palestine. Regarded as a heroine in France, she was released prematurely but imprisoned a year later in Israel for alleged involvement in the killing of Folke Bernadotte. The charges were later dropped. After her release from prison, she settled at age 23 in Beersheba, Israel, where she had three children and founded a nightclub that became Beersheba's cultural centre. She died at age 38.

In total, three of Ariadna Scriabina's children immigrated to Israel after the war, where her son Eli (born 1935) became a sailor in the Israeli Navy and a noted classical guitarist, while her son Joseph (Yossi, born 1943) served in the Israeli special forces, before becoming a poet, publishing many poems dedicated to his mother. One of her great-grandsons, via Betty (Elizabeth) Lazarus, Elisha Abas, is an Israeli concert pianist.

Julian Scriabin, a child prodigy, was a composer and pianist, but died by drowning at age 11 in Ukraine.

References

Notes

Citations

Sources

External links
 UK Scriabin Association
 
 

Recordings
 Scriabin's own recording of the third and fourth Movements from his Piano Sonata, no. 3, Op. 23 (The Pianola Institute)
 Piano Rolls (The Reproducing Piano Roll Foundation)
 Scriabin Etude Op.8 No.12

1872 births
1915 deaths
19th-century classical composers
19th-century classical pianists
19th-century male musicians
20th-century classical composers
20th-century classical pianists
20th-century Russian male musicians
Composers for piano
Deaths from sepsis
Infectious disease deaths in Russia
Male classical pianists
Modernist composers
Moscow Conservatory alumni
Academic staff of Moscow Conservatory
Musicians from Moscow
20th-century mystics
Pupils of Nikolai Zverev
Pupils of Sergei Taneyev
Russian classical pianists
Russian inventors
Russian male classical composers
Russian Romantic composers
Russian symbolism
Russian Theosophists
Synesthesia
Russian nobility